Uzhavan Magan is a 1987 Indian Tamil-language action drama film, directed by R. Aravindraj and produced by A. S. Ibrahim Ravuthar. The film stars Vijayakanth, Raadhika, Radha and Radha Ravi.

Plot 

Chinna Durai, a farmer lives quietly in his village when Nirmala and Gunasekhar intervene to wreak havoc.

For revenge, Nirmala's family and Chinna Durai's father insist on getting married.  While the wedding is in preparation, Gunasekhar's troops twist the neck of Durai's father. Chinna Durai seeing him dead, is embarked on Guna's general surprise and his relatives for attempted murder to the police leaving her lover Selvi.

While Chinna Durai is in prison, the little brother Siva says that he wants to get revenge for Guna making her new husband believe in Nirmala but already had a positive relationship in the past. Chinnai Durai delivered and his brother Siva will now recover their father's property.

Cast 
Vijayakanth as Chinna Durai / Siva
Raadhika as Selvi
Radha as Nirmala
Radha Ravi as Gunasekhar
M. N. Nambiar as Chinna Durai's father
Malaysia Vasudevan as Nirmala's father
S. S. Chandran as Kannakku Pillai
Senthil as Chinna Durai's friend
Pandari Bai as Guna's mother
A. Sakunthala as Guna's sister
Kovai Sarala as Kannakku Pillai's daughter
Kullamani as Chinna Durai's friend

Soundtrack 
The soundtrack was composed by Manoj–Gyan, and the lyrics were written by Aabavanan.

Release and reception 
Uzhavan Magan got released on 21 October 1987 alongside another Vijayakanth film Sattam Oru Vilayaattu and it faced heavy competition from Nayakan and Manithan. However, all films went on to become successful in box-office. N. Krishnaswamy of The Indian Express wrote, "[..] the narrative lacks believability, because there isn't any feeling in this film".

References

External links 

 

1980s action drama films
1980s Tamil-language films
1987 action films
1987 drama films
1987 films
Films directed by R. Aravindraj
Films scored by Manoj–Gyan
Indian action drama films